Clocker or Clockers may also refer to:
 Clocker (train), a former Amtrak rail service
 Clocker (composition), a minimalist electronic music piece by Alvin Lucier conceived in 1978.
 Clockers (novel), a novel by Richard Price
 Clockers (film), a 1995 film Spike Lee based on the Price novel
 Clocker (Transformers), either of two characters in the Transformers universe
 Someone who times horses for a handicap race